Saint-Jacques (the French name for Saint James) may refer to:

Canada
 Saint-Jacques Cathedral (Montreal), built in 1822 and demolished in 1973
 Saint-Jacques (electoral district), a former federal electoral district in Quebec
 Saint-Jacques (provincial electoral district), Montreal, Quebec, Canada
 Saint-Jacques, New Brunswick, a former village, now part of Edmundston
 Saint-Jacques Parish, New Brunswick
 Saint-Jacques, Quebec, a municipality in the province of Quebec
 Saint-Jacques-de-Leeds, Quebec, a municipality in the province of Quebec
 Saint-Jacques-le-Majeur-de-Wolfestown, a parish in the province of Quebec
 Saint-Jacques-le-Mineur, Quebec, a parish in the province of Quebec
 Saint-Jacques River (Portneuf River tributary), Quebec
 Saint Jacques River (Roussillon), Quebec

France
 Saint-Jacques, Alpes-de-Haute-Provence, in the Alpes-de-Haute-Provence department
 Saint-Jacques-d'Aliermont, in the Seine-Maritime department
 Saint-Jacques-d'Ambur, in the Puy-de-Dôme department
 Saint-Jacques-d'Atticieux, in the Ardèche department
 Saint-Jacques-de-la-Lande, in the Ille-et-Vilaine department
 Saint-Jacques-de-Néhou, in the Manche department
 Saint-Jacques-des-Arrêts, in the Rhône department
 Saint-Jacques-des-Blats, in the Cantal department
 Saint-Jacques-des-Guérets, in the Loir-et-Cher department
 Saint-Jacques-de-Thouars, in the Deux-Sèvres department
 Saint-Jacques-en-Valgodemard, in the Hautes-Alpes department
 Saint-Jacques-sur-Darnétal, in the Seine-Maritime department
 Ville-Saint-Jacques, in the Seine-et-Marne department

Other
 Saint Jacques (grape), a name for the French/German wine grape Pinot Noir Précoce
 Saint-Jacques (Paris Métro)

See also 
 St-Jacques, a surname
 St. Jacques (disambiguation)
 Saint James (disambiguation)